The 1984–85 Real Madrid Club de Fútbol season was the club's 83rd season in existence and their 54th consecutive season in the top flight of Spanish football.

Summary
The club announced a new coach Amancio Amaro on 21 May 1984. A former Madrid player, Amaro trained reserve team Castilla the last two seasons. The managerial change was a sign of President Luis de Carlos beginning to accelerate the transitional stage of "La Quinta del Buitre" which Amancio managed himself. The team was reinforced with Argentine forward Jorge Valdano from Real Zaragoza, with goalkeeper Otxotorena and young midfielder Michel being promoted from Castilla.

During September a players labour strike occurred, and Real Madrid played the second round on 9 September 1984 with its reserve team. However, a Federal Court suspended the third round until clubs and football players reach an agreement, which was signed two weeks later and the league championship was restarted again. After four seasons without a League title and a bad streak of results during this campaign, chairman Luis de Carlos, facing the pressure from the Board of Directors, anticipated the Presidential Election one year early, instead of 1986. On 1 May 1985, former vice-president Ramón Mendoza remained as the sole candidate to the election after the other two challengers Eduardo Peña and Juanito Navarro declined.

Finally, on 24 May 1985, Luis de Carlos appointed Mendoza as new president. In addition to La Liga, Real Madrid also competed in the Copa del Rey, the Copa de la Liga, and the UEFA Cup. Madrid secured their first ever UEFA Cup trophy with a win over Hungarian side Videoton in the final after 19 years without a continental title. By defeating city rivals Atlético in the final of the Copa de la Liga, Real also secured their first and only title in that competition. In the Copa del Rey, the club was again defeated by Athletic Bilbao.

Squad

Transfers

Competitions

La Liga

Position by round

League table

Matches

Copa del Rey

Round of 16

Copa de la Liga

Final

Real Madrid won 4–2 on aggregate.

UEFA Cup

First round

Real Madrid won 5–2 on aggregate.

Second round

Real Madrid won 4–3 on aggregate.

Third round

Real Madrid won 6–4 on aggregate.

Quarter-finals

Real Madrid won 1–0 on aggregate.

Semi-finals

Real Madrid won 3–2 on aggregate.

Final

Real Madrid won 3–1 on aggregate.

Statistics

Players statistics

Squad during strike

See also
La Quinta del Buitre

References

External links
RSSSF – 1985 Copa de la Liga

Real Madrid CF seasons
Real Madrid CF
UEFA Europa League-winning seasons